Abbas in Flower is a 1982 Turkish comedy film directed by Sinan Çetin.

Plot

Cast 
 İlyas Salman - Abbas
 Şener Şen - Sakir
 Ayşen Gruda - Sükriye
 Pembe Mutlu - Nazli

External links 

1982 films
1982 comedy-drama films
Turkish comedy-drama films
1982 comedy films
1982 drama films